ZPV1 is the FM station of Paraguay's state broadcaster, Radio Nacional del Paraguay. It transmits on 95.1 MHz with an effective radiated power of 100,000 watts. It is the sister station to AM station ZP1, but airs different programming.ZPV1 airs a public radio format in the Spanish & Guarani languages.

References

External links
Official website of Radio Nacional del Paraguay
Conatel’s list of licensed FM radio stations; retrieved December 29, 2021.

Radio stations in Paraguay
News and talk radio stations